Prelude to Axanar (working title: Star Trek: Prelude to Axanar, and long title: The Four Years War Part III: Prelude to Axanar) is a 2014 fan-made short film, directed by Christian Gossett and written by Gossett and Alec Peters. Funded through Kickstarter, production sought $10,000 in funding, but raised $101,000. It had its public debut July 26, 2014 at the San Diego Comic-Con.

Set in the Star Trek universe, the film stars Kate Vernon, Tony Todd, Richard Hatch, Gary Graham, and J. G. Hertzler, in a documentary-style film recounting the events surrounding the Battle of Axanar, mentioned without any detail in passing in the original Star Trek series episode Whom Gods Destroy, here depicted as a decisive military engagement between the United Federation of Planets and the Klingon Empire.

Production
Alec Peters and his original production partner, co-writer and director Christian Gossett, began work on the film in 2010. Gossett's production company, Metamorfic was brought on board as Peters had no previous production experience. Prior to 2016, the Star Trek rights holders, primarily Paramount Studios, had generally allowed fan-made projects to move forward just "as long as they agreed not to sell anything—including tickets, merchandise, or copies of the finished film or series." To circumvent these limitations Peters employed both a Kickstarter and a fan funding campaign which eventually exceeded his initial funding goal of $10,000 by raising $101,000.

The film was shot in two days, with a third day as a pickup to get plates of Admiral Ramirez's first speech as leader of the Federation of Planets. Cast includes Richard Hatch and J. G. Hertzler in principal roles, with Gary Graham reprising his role as Vulcan ambassador Soval. The film maker's stated purpose was to demonstrate that high quality Star Trek films could be made on a low budget.  The film's makeup was by Kevin Haney, sound design was by Frank Serafine, and visual effects were the work of Tobias Richter and Tommy Kraft.

Plot
The film is presented as one episode of a Federation documentary pertaining to a "Four Years War" (a supplement of FASA's Star Trek: The Role Playing Game in the 1980s) with the Klingon Empire, narrated by fictional noted historian John Gill (who appeared in "Patterns of Force") and featuring interviews of participants on both sides. The events depicted reportedly precede Star Trek: The Original Series by two decades, with the war's opening battle at Arcanis IV, a prosperous Federation colony along the Klingon border. The Klingons, who did not consider the Federation to be a worthy adversary, maintained the initiative for the first six months of the war, with a number of victories under the leadership of their supreme commander, Kharn. The Vulcan diplomatic delegation under Ambassador Soval (who appeared on Star Trek: Enterprise), overseeing negotiations with the Klingons, are left with little room to maneuver.

In response to the losses suffered in the war, Starfleet appoints a new Commander-in-Chief, Admiral Marcus Ramirez, who pledges in a fleet-wide broadcast to defend "the dream of the Federation" against the Klingons' commitment to its destruction. Ramirez oversees the creation of the Ares-class cruisers, Starfleet's first warships, to counter the Klingons' mainstay, the D6 battlecruiser. The introduction of the Ares turns the tide against the Klingons, who begin to give Starfleet its due as a worthy opponent, and particularly take notice of Garth of Izar (who appeared in "Whom Gods Destroy"), the captain of the prototype USS Ares.

To counter the Ares cruisers, the Klingons order the construction of a newer and more advanced battlecruiser, the D7, that would restore the Klingons' technical and military advantage. In response, Starfleet begins developing their own next-generation heavy cruiser, the Constitution-class, but construction falls behind schedule. To gain more time to finish their new heavy cruiser, Starfleet approves a plan proposed by Garth to fight the Klingons at Axanar, the planet where Kharn's spies have reported the Constitution prototypes (revealed to be the Constitution and the Enterprise) are being built. The narrative concludes shortly before the battle at Axanar, when the first three D7s enter the war, leaving the audience to wonder what actually happened in the battle itself.

Cast
 Richard Hatch as Kharn (aka Kharn the Undying), Klingon Supreme Warlord, Four Years War
 Tony Todd as Admiral Marcus Ramirez, Starfleet Commander in Chief, Four Years War
 Kate Vernon as Captain Sonya Alexander, commanding officer of the USS Ajax, Four Years War
 J. G. Hertzler as Admiral Samuel Travis, former Captain of the USS Hercules, Four Years War
 Gary Graham as Soval, Vulcan Ambassador to the Federation
 Alec Peters as Captain Kelvar Garth, commanding officer of the USS Ares, Four Years War

Reception
Jana Monji of RogerEbert.com spoke during the film's private red carpet screening at the Horton Plaza UA Cinema prior to its debut at San Diego's Comic-Con, and offered that involvement of known acting talent dedicated to the genre and to Prelude to Axanar might increase Star Trek fan influence at such events. By way of example, the film's inclusion of Richard Hatch of the original TV series Battlestar Galactica would have the "fan-verse" of the two series collide in a positive manner.

Houston Press called it a functional example of "demonstration of concept," and urged Star Trek fans to see the film. They praised the cast, writing "actors (Richard Hatch, Tony Todd, etc.) have some serious chops," and noted that the film's visual effects "are stunning."

Home Media Magazine shared "the film’s high production values, cinema-quality special effects and the involvement of actors from the canonical Star Trek series elevates Prelude to Axanar beyond the status of a mere fan film."

Author David Gerrold, writer of The Trouble with Tribbles and contributor to both the original Star Trek series and Star Trek: The Next Generation, after reading the Axanar script for the first time, stated "This is Star Trek." Liking the concept, and being so personally familiar with the Star Trek universe, he signed on as creative consultant.

Guardian Liberty Voice wrote "The acting is superb, including appealing performances from Gary Graham as a Vulcan ambassador, Richard Hatch as the sweet-eyed Klingon General Kharn and the magnetic Kate Vernon as Starfleet Captain Sonya Alexander," and praised the film, writing "Prelude to Axanar is of the highest Hollywood-style production quality and a must-see for any devotee of the franchise."

Entertainment News International drew the conclusion that "Axanar is a ground breaking independent film that proves the idea that a studio doesn't need to spend millions of dollars to produce a feature quality production. Axanar will be the first non-CBS/Paramount produced Star Trek to look and feel like a true Star Trek movie."

Awards
"Prelude to Axanar" won six of nine categories in the 2015 Independent Star Trek Fan Film Awards (Best Production Design; Best Visual Effects; Best Soundtrack; Best Original Story or Screenplay; Best Director; and Best Dramatic Presentation, Short Form), presented at and by Treklanta.

Release
Prelude to Axanar released a three-minute teaser-trailer on June 11, 2014. The completed 21 minute short film had a private red carpet premiere July 26, 2014 at San Diego's Horton Plaza UA Cinema and its public debut screening at the 2014 Comic-Con. Available through the Axanar Productions YouTube page, the Prelude to Axanar film includes subtitles in eight languages: French, Spanish, German, Dutch, Czech and Portuguese, as well as both American and British English.

Planned feature film
Raising $638,000 on Kickstarter through the creation and release of Prelude to Axanar, Peters went into pre-production for the feature film Star Trek: Axanar, with production slated to begin in October 2015, for an early 2016 release.  The original plan was to raise financing "in chunks", with the initial Kickstarter to raise enough money to obtain a warehouse, convert it to a sound stage and build sets. Approximately $200,000 of the funding happened in the campaign's final 49 hours, after Star Trek alum George Takei shared his interest publicly, bringing production more than six-times the originally sought amount of $100,000.  The cast was planned to include Richard Hatch as Kharn the Undying (Klingon supreme commander); J. G. Hertzler as Admiral Samuel Travis (Captain of the USS Hercules); Gary Graham as Soval (Vulcan Ambassador to the Federation); and Kate Vernon as Captain Sonya Alexander (Captain of the USS Ajax).

On January 3, 2016, Alec Peters announced he would no longer portray Captain Kelvar Garth in the Axanar movie, stating that he wanted to hire a professional actor to fill the role, which would allow him to focus more on writing and producing.

In July 2020 a screen shot of actor Gary Graham's social media page showed his announcement that he had left the project.  The following month co-writer and director Paul Jenkins announced through his production company that his association with Axanar had ended.

In July 2022, Peters released a video on YouTube indicating that principal photography was wrapping up and that the project was proceeding to completion.

Lawsuit
On December 29, 2015, CBS and Paramount Pictures filed a copyright lawsuit seeking damages in the US District Court for the Central District of California, alleging that the Axanar works infringed their rights by making use of the Klingon language and "innumerable copyrighted elements of Star Trek, including its settings, characters, species, and themes".

On March 28, 2016, Axanar Productions filed a motion to dismiss or strike Paramount and CBS's claims on the basis that the elements mentioned in the court filing were not protected by copyright and it was seeking premature relief from a work, the Axanar film, that did not exist.

On May 9, 2016, the motion to dismiss the lawsuit was denied. Later that month, J. J. Abrams said that "within the next few weeks, it will be announced this is going away". Abrams said he pushed the studio to stop the lawsuit, because "we realized this is not the appropriate way to deal with the fans."  This statement by Abrams had no apparent effect on the lawsuit, since the case was scheduled for a jury trial in early 2017.

On June 23, 2016, Paramount and CBS released new fan film guidelines, which Axanar staff described as "disheartening" and "draconian." Alec Peters had several times suggested that the rights holders should issue guidelines to fan film makers, even going so far as proposing some prior to the CBS official guidelines release, a number of which were similar to those finally imposed. Yet, Peters began talking about these guidelines only after the lawsuit and after it became known that CBS were going to set their guidelines - Peters was trying to influence the final form of the CBS guidelines. The discussion about the proposal to CBS was happening in a private Facebook group and it was agreed that the proposal to CBS would not include crowdfunding ban, while this ban would be a crucial part of CBS guidelines.  CBS cited crowdfunding as the reason for new and more strict Star Trek fan film guidelines.

On January 5, 2017, U.S. District Court judge R. Gary Klausner rejected various motions by both parties, setting the stage for a civil trial on the matter to go forward on January 31. On January 20, 2017, the parties announced that the lawsuit had been settled, with Peters and Axanar Productions promising to make "substantial changes" to Axanar and agreeing to abide by Paramount's and CBS' "Guidelines for Fan Films." Under the terms of the settlement, the filmmakers will be allowed to release two 15-minute movies, instead of their planned 90-minute feature. The films cannot be shown with commercials.

References

External links
 Prelude to Axanar at the Internet Movie Database
 Axanar Productions official site
 Prelude to Axanar (Official) at YouTube
 CBS and Paramount Pictures Guidelines for Star Trek Fan Films

2014 films
2014 short films
2014 action drama films
2014 science fiction action films
2014 independent films
American independent films
American science fiction action films
American space adventure films
Fan films based on Star Trek
Films set in the 23rd century
Films set in the future
Films shot in Los Angeles
2014 directorial debut films
2010s science fiction drama films
2010s English-language films
Kickstarter-funded films
2010s American films